Huwag Kang Mangamba (International title: Mysterious Destiny / ) is a Philippine television drama broadcast by Kapamilya Channel, A2Z and TV5. It aired from March 22, 2021 to November 12, 2021 on the channel's Primetime Bida evening block and worldwide via The Filipino Channel, replacing Ang sa Iyo ay Akin.

Series overview

 iWantTFC shows two episodes first in advance before its television broadcast.

Episodes

Season 1

References

Lists of Philippine drama television series episodes